Yên Dũng is a rural district of Bắc Giang province in the Northeast region of Vietnam. As of 2018 the district had a population of 138,000. The district covers an area of 213 km². The district capital lies at Nham Biền.

The district includes the townships of Nham Biền, Tân An and the rural communes of:
Đồng Phúc
Đồng Việt
Tư Mại
Đức Giang
Tiến Dũng
Cảnh Thụy
Lãng Sơn
Trí Yên
Lão Hộ
Xuân Phú
Tân Liễu
Tiền Phong
Yên Lư
Hương Gián
Quỳnh Sơn
Nội Hoàng

References

Districts of Bắc Giang province